The emblem of North Korea is a national symbol adopted in 1993 by the state. Its design is modified from the former version in use from the founding of North Korea in 1948. Prominent features on the emblem are a red star, a hydroelectric plant (the Sup'ung dam) and Mount Paektu. The design bears similarities to the emblem of the Soviet Union and other emblems of the socialist heraldic style.

Prior to the establishment of the North Korean state, two former versions were in use from 1945 to 1947.

History
During the Liberation of Korea in 1945 by the Allies, Northern Korea had no emblem although the emblem of the People's Republic of Korea was used from 1945 to 1946. The first equivalent of an emblem appeared on January 1, 1946, printed below a speech of Kim Il-sung in the newspaper Chŏngro. It features the Korean Peninsula surrounded by a pattern of ribbons and wheat identical to that of the Soviet State Emblem. This was the only time it was ever used, and between 1946 and 1948 a simple outline of the peninsula was displayed in its place. This was intended to signal that the North and the South are one country.

However, in July 1948 as the division of Korea loomed, North Korea adopted its first constitution. This constitution defined the North Korean emblem, but the emblem was in use for only two months. It features a furnace, as opposed to a hydroelectric plant on later designs.

On September 9, 1948, the Democratic People's Republic of Korea was declared and a new emblem adopted. The chosen motif: the Sup'ung hydroelectric plant was built by the Imperial Japanese during their colonial rule over the Korean Peninsula, and as such could be not comfortable as symbol of national pride for nationalistic Koreans. However, North Korean sources claim that Kim Il-sung was behind the design. In 1993, the emblem was further amended to feature Mount Paektu. The mountain is an important symbol of power and legitimacy of the Kim family dynasty in North Korean propaganda, and is especially identified with Kim Jong-il because it is where official narratives place his birth. The adoption of that symbol testified to the rise of his status.

Features

The emblem features the Sup'ung dam under Mount Paektu and a power line as the escutcheon. The crest is a five-pointed red star. It is supported with ears of rice, bound with a red ribbon bearing the inscription "The Democratic People's Republic of Korea" in Chosongul characters.

While the design of the hydroelectric plant is generic in appearance, its identity is given away by the fact that Sup'ung was the only power station of its kind at the time when the emblem was designed. Sup'ung was constructed by the Japanese and is located in what is today the border with the People's Republic of China. In spite of the uncomfortable reference to colonial infrastructure as well as foreign territory, the choice of the image is not incidental and carries positive connotations. In the late 1940s, the North produced most of the electricity in the country. The dam symbolizes self-sufficiency in electricity: in the spring of 1948 shortly before the hydroelectric plant was added to the emblem, North Korea cut off her power network from the South.

The emblem, and all of its predecessors, follows the basic socialist heraldic design that was adopted in many other countries including, which clearly indicates the relations between the communist ideology and the foundation of the country at the onset of the Cold War.

See also

Flag of North Korea
Emblem of South Korea

References

Further reading

External links

 National Emblem of the DPRK  at Naenara

National symbols of North Korea
Korea, North
Korea, North
North Korea
North Korea
North Korea
North Korea
Korean heraldry